Pyrgiscus taiaroa is a species of sea snail, a marine gastropod mollusk in the family Pyramidellidae, the pyrams and their allies.

References

 Spencer, H.G., Marshall, B.A. & Willan, R.C. (2009). Checklist of New Zealand living Mollusca. pp 196–219. in: Gordon, D.P. (ed.) New Zealand inventory of biodiversity. Volume one. Kingdom Animalia: Radiata, Lophotrochozoa, Deuterostomia. Canterbury University Press, Christchurch

External links
 To World Register of Marine Species
  Laws C.R. 1937. Review of the Tertiary and Recent Neozelanic Pyramidellid Molluscs. No. 3 — Further Turbonillid Genera. Transactions and Proceedings of the Royal Society of New Zealand, 67: 166-184, pl. 34-35
 Spencer H.G., Willan R.C., Marshall B.A. & Murray T.J. (2011). Checklist of the Recent Mollusca Recorded from the New Zealand Exclusive Economic Zone

Pyramidellidae
Gastropods described in 1937